KLVU is a non-commercial Christian contemporary music radio station in Sweet Home, Oregon, broadcasting to the Eugene-Springfield, Oregon area on 107.1 FM.

External links
Official Website

Contemporary Christian radio stations in the United States
K-Love radio stations
Sweet Home, Oregon
Radio stations established in 1993
1993 establishments in Oregon
Educational Media Foundation radio stations
LVU